Welhaven is a Norwegian surname. Notable people with the surname include:

Elisabeth Welhaven (1815–1901), Norwegian writer
Hjalmar Welhaven (1850–1922), Norwegian architect, palace manager, and sportsman
Johan Sebastian Welhaven (1807–1873), Norwegian writer, poet, critic and art theorist
Kristian Welhaven (1883–1975), Norwegian police chief
Sigri Welhaven (1894–1991), Norwegian sculptor

Norwegian-language surnames